Todd Daniel Moore, professionally known as LT Moe (sometimes stylized as L.T.-mOE) is an American record producer from Cleveland, Ohio.

Production credits

2004
Ludacris - The Red Light District
 10. Spur of the Moment (featuring DJ Quik & Kimmi J)
Jean Grae - This Week
 10. The Wall

2005
Disturbing tha Peace - Ludacris Presents: Disturbing tha Peace
 13. Table Dance (performed by Bobby Valentino, Lil Fate, and Smoke of Field Mob)
Tony Yayo - Thoughts of a Predicate Felon
 09. Pimpin'
Rohff - Au-Delà De Mes Limites
 01. Le Cauchemar Du Rap Français
 10. Premier Sur Le Ghetto
 12. Le Pouvoir
 21. La Violence
 22. Accepte-Moi Comme Je Suis
 23. Le Club Des Métaphores
 28. Toujours

2006
M-1 - Confidential
 10. Don't Put Down Your Flag (featuring Young Dre The Truth)
Tha Dogg Pound - Cali Iz Active
 02. Kushin 'N Pushin
Shady Records - Eminem Presents: The Re-Up
 23. Billion Bucks (Bonus Track) (performed by Stat Quo)

2007
4-IZE - Fantastik 4-IZE
 12. Follow the Drip
Pitbull - The Boatlift
 11. My Life (featuring Jason Derulo)
Chingy - Hate It or Love It
 01. Intro
 04. Fly Like Me (featuring Amerie)
 08. Trickin' Off
 10. 2 Kool 2 Dance
 12. How We Feel (featuring Anthony Hamilton)

2008
Dem Franchize Boyz - Our World, Our Way
 07. Turn Heads (featuring Lloyd)
Murs - Murs for President
 06. Everything
Murphy Lee - You See Me
 23. My Shoes (Bonus Track) (featuring Kanja)

2009
Ghostface Killah - Ghostdini: Wizard of Poetry in Emerald City
 11. I'll Be That (featuring Adrienne Bailon)
Willy Northpole - Tha Connect
 11. Vegas Lights
Fast Life Yungstaz - Jamboree
 07. Across the Globe (featuring Sammie)
Playaz Circle - Flight 360: The Takeoff
 14. Ghetto (featuring Cee-Lo Green & Sunni Patterson)

2010 
Quincy Jones - Q Soul Bossa Nostra
 03. Soul Bossa Nostra (featuring Ludacris, Naturally 7, and Rudy Currence)

2011 
CJ Platinum - Last Man Standing
 04. Patron Or Ciroc

2013 
Machine Gun Kelly - Black Flag
 07. Skate Cans

2014 
Algebra Blessett - Recovery
 01. Exordium to Recovery
 06. Augment to Recovery
 08. Writer's Block
 10. Danger Zone
Stat Quo - ATLA: All This Life Allows, Vol. 1
 11. Pussy (featuring Devin the Dude)
2018

Jaquees - “4275”

.  15. Infatuated (feat LaTocha Scott)

2019

Wale - “Wow... That’s Crazy”

.  7. On Chill (feat Jeremih)

2020

Da Great Ape - “STR8DROP”

.  4. Think Bigger

Eric Bellinger - “Eric B. for President: Term 3

.  1. Godly

Other
The Plague CO. EP
Executive Produced by L.T. mOE
Ludacris ft. Snoop Dogg, Nate Dogg & Katt Williams
"Good Relationships"
(INTERNET LEAK)
Murphy Lee ft. Day 26
"Mad at Me"
Featured on Murphy Lee mix-album "I'm Free"

Lil Scrappy The Shape Up-Mixtape w/Don Cannon/Tee The Barber/DJ Infamous
"Chop It Up" (Video also available)
"Bet"
"Onna Role" (also known as "On a role" or "I'm on a roll")

Lil Scrappy "Wall Money" FT: Tity Boi and OJ Da Juiceman''

"Come Down the Pole" Short Dawg feat Mack Maine Young Money Records
Kandi Burruss  " Kandi Koated"
"How Could You...Feel My Pain"

Tez McClain ft Erk tha Jerk "Right Now"

Bando Jonez "Sex You" (co produced by Polow Da Don)

VVS (Verse Simmonds) Feat. K Camp "Mona Lisa" (Featured on K Camp Mixtape: K.I.S.S 2)

Dondria Nicole "Coattail"
 Donny Arcade - Emerald Tablets  - Featuring Layzie Bone, Anjolique,  4biddenknowledge AKA Billy CarsonDo itArtist: Snoop dogg
Album: blue carpet treatmentThe BestArtist: Stat Quo
Project: EA Sports...NBA Live 2005(2 million sold)ProblemsArtist: Stat Quo
Album: STATLANTARock Da PartyArtist: Stat QuoProject: EA Sports...Madden 2006(4 million sold)Like Dat(co-produced by LT Moe)Artist: Stat Quo
Album: STATLANTAHerculesMoney TalksArtist: CzarNock

Album: That One WayCarpe DiemArtist: Singuila(EMI/France/Hostile)My Shoes''' video premiered on WSHH -[Worldstarhiphop.com]- on 11.14.08 and reaching over 3million views by 11-19.08

L.T. mOE nominated Producer of the Year 2009 Duval Diamond Awards

References

External links

Living people
People from Cleveland
Year of birth missing (living people)